Energy & Utility Skills is an employer-led membership organization that helps to ensure the gas, power, waste management and water industries have the skills they need - now and in the future.

Function
Through a range of products and services, the organization help employers attract new talent, develop their existing workforces, and assure a high level of competence across their businesses. 
 
As the UK authority on professional development and employment in the energy and utilities industries, Energy & Utility Skills help their members embrace new talent and technology to meet the challenges of a competitive global market. Market intelligence is central to their approach. From projecting skills gaps to benchmarking standards, they provide the most accurate, up-to-date information on skills and employment in the energy and utilities sector. 
 
Their partnerships with employers, Government bodies and educational institutions help them to support the UK's agenda, shape the future of the sector's workforce and ensure their stakeholders get the most from their investments.

Industries
 Gas
 Power
 Water
 Waste Management

Structure
The Chief Executive of Energy & Utility Skills is Phil Beach. The headquarters of Energy & Utility Skills is in Solihull, West Midlands. The Energy & Utilities Independent Assessment Service (EUIAS) and the Energy & Utility Skills Register (EUSR) are both part of the Energy & Utility Skills Group. 

The National Skills Academy for Power in Solihull is also part of the Energy & Utility Skills Group.

See also
 National Inspection Council for Electrical Installation Contracting, based in Bedfordshire, also known as the NICEIC

References

External links
 Energy and Utility Skills Site

Education in Solihull
Electric power in the United Kingdom
Electrical safety
Electrical trades organizations
Energy education
Energy organizations
Engineering education in the United Kingdom
Natural gas industry in the United Kingdom
Natural gas safety
Sector Skills Councils